Melahat Özgü Namal (born 28 December 1978) is a Turkish actress.

Biography
Her maternal family are Turkish immigrants from Thessaloniki, Ottoman Empire (now in Greece). Her paternal family is Turkish immigrant from Macedonia. Özgü Amel Namal started acting at the Masal Gerçek Theatre when she was a child. She graduated from the theater department of the State Conservatory of Istanbul University. She made her television debut in Affet Bizi Hocam and then appeared in the TV series Karete Can, hit series Yeditepe İstanbul, in one of the longest hit series  Kurtlar Vadisi as Elif Eylül, "Hanımın Çiftliği"
based on a classic novel by Orhan Kemal and "Merhamet" based on a novel by Hande Altaylı.

Namal made her film debut in Sır Çocukları in 2002. Since then, she appeared in several other films such as Anlat İstanbul, Büyü, Organize İşler, Polis, Beynelmilel and O... Çocukları. She was awarded the Golden Orange for Best Actress for her performance in Mutluluk in 2007.

Filmography

Television

Film

TV programs
2008: Koca Kafalar
2014–2015: Yetenek Sizsiniz Türkiye (judge)

References

External links

1978 births
Living people
People from Üsküdar
Turkish film actresses
Turkish television actresses
20th-century Turkish actresses
Best Actress Golden Orange Award winners